TVX is a Salvadoran subscription television channel operated by Master Communications through Channel 23 of El Salvador that was founded in 1989, after it was replaced by Star Channel in April 2007, and The channel was founded by Oscar Berrios on 5 of November 2012, and left the TV station channel on December 13, 2018 replaced to Tele1 serving only on cable television channel.

History 
It was inaugurated in 1989, as a new proposal for a Salvadoran channel. The creation of the channel is due to a study done to Salvadoran youth by private companies, where they discover their predilection for musical programs, especially in which video clips are presented. From here comes the first musical channel in the country. From March to May 1994, it initiates the test transmissions and in June of the same year its formal transmissions began.

For the year 2007, Channel 23 was replaced by Star Channel that passed music videos, and sometimes put programs related to the music.

After Star Channel, it replaced with TVX that today we know, began their broadcasts to the 5 of November 2012, and since then it transmits own programming, such as newscasts, reports and programs of opinion. It also broadcasts alternative programming, such as series and films by national and Latin American producers, and at the end of that same year it reinforced its programming with anime series and films and in lesser number of US programs. In 2015 it decided to go to cable in a permanent, leaving channel 23 as the national feed,  until Tele1 replaced the TV station feed on December 14, 2018.

Logos

References 

2012 establishments in El Salvador
Television stations in El Salvador
Spanish-language television stations
Television channels and stations established in 2012